Town of the Dragon is a 2014 Chinese suspense comedy film directed by Xue Cun. It was released on October 17.

Cast
Xue Cun
Yu Qing
Ying Da
Yvonne Yung
Lam Suet
Zhu Jie
Qin Xueshi
Li Bin
Miao Haizhong
Niu Mengmeng

Reception
By October 20, the film had earned ¥0.23 million at the Chinese box office.

References

2014 comedy films
Chinese comedy films
Chinese suspense films